The third season of Blue Bloods, a police procedural drama series created by Robin Green and Mitchell Burgess, premiered on CBS September 28, 2012. Leonard Goldberg serves as executive producer.

According to TV by the Numbers, committing to a third season of Blue Bloods meant that CBS was all but guaranteed to commit to a fourth season.  This was because as a CBS Television Studios production, CBS has a financial incentive to produce at least the minimum number of episodes needed for stripped syndication. On March 27, 2013, CBS made it official by renewing Blue Bloods for a fourth season to begin in the fall of 2013.

Cast 
Donnie Wahlberg, Bridget Moynahan, Will Estes and Len Cariou are first credited, with Tom Selleck receiving an "and" billing at the close of the main title sequence. Amy Carlson and Sami Gayle are once again credited as "also starring" within the episodes they appear, whilst Jennifer Esposito entered a dispute with CBS regarding doctor's orders for her to cut back working hours due to her Coeliac disease. Rather than work around her limited schedule, CBS chose to replace her character this season. As such, Esposito only appears in six episodes, receiving "also starring" billing in all of them.

CBS has lined up guest stars to replace Esposito as Danny's temporary partner in story arcs. First up is Megan Ketch as Detective Kate Lansing. Megan Boone, from Law & Order: LA, appeared in later arcs during the season, although her contract stipulates she has the option to remain as a regular, "also starring" member of the cast should a deal not be reached with Esposito before the fourth season. Marisa Ramirez appeared in the final seven episodes as Danny's partner, Det. Maria Baez.

Main cast 
Tom Selleck as Police Commissioner Francis "Frank" Reagan
Donnie Wahlberg as Detective 1st Grade Daniel "Danny" Reagan
Bridget Moynahan as ADA Erin Reagan
Will Estes as Officer Jamison "Jamie" Reagan
Len Cariou as Henry Reagan
Amy Carlson as Linda Reagan 
Sami Gayle as Nicole "Nicky" Reagan-Boyle 
Jennifer Esposito as Detective 1st Grade Jackie Curatola

Recurring cast 

Megan Ketch as Detective 1st Grade Kate Lansing
Marisa Ramirez as Detective 1st Grade Maria Baez
Robert Clohessy as Sergeant Sidney "Sid" Gormley
Abigail Hawk as Detective 1st Grade Abigail Baker
Nicholas Turturro as Sargeant Anthony Renzulli 
Peter Hermann as Jack Boyle 
Ato Essandoh as Reverend Darnell Potter 
Tony Terraciano as Jack Reagan 
Andrew Terraciano as Sean Reagan

Episodes

Ratings

References

External links

2012 American television seasons
2013 American television seasons
Blue Bloods (TV series)